Morgan John Evans (born 25 April 1985) is an Australian country music singer and songwriter. He released a self-titled debut studio album in March 2014, which peaked at number 20 on the ARIA Albums Chart. In 2019, he won the ARIA Award for Best Country Album for his second studio album, Things That We Drink To. Evans also had a crossover hit in the United States with "Kiss Somebody" in 2017.

Biography

1985–2010: Early life and career beginnings
Evans was born on 25 April 1985 in Newcastle. He has a younger sister, Jane, and a younger brother, Tom,  who is also a musician playing bass guitar. At the age of 13, Evans performed his first gig. Whilst attending Warners Bay High School he was in a local rock trio, Extortion, which won a state high school band competition, Youthrock, in 2002.

Extortion were later renamed Solver. As of 2006 Evans provided lead vocals and guitar in that group, Tom was on bass guitar and a friend, Nicholas Cook, was the drummer. The band won Artist of the Year and Best Rock Act at the MusicOZ Awards of 2006.

In 2007 Evans won the Road to Tamworth competition and for his prize he flew to Nashville to record a single. He was signed to Sony BMG and released his debut single "Big Skies", in September 2007. The title track received airplay on Australian country music radio stations.

Evans toured with Brooks & Dunn, Gary Allan, Shannon Noll, Adam Harvey & was personally selected by Taylor Swift to open her first Australian tour.

2012–2016: Debut studio album
In January 2012 Evans released his debut EP, Live Each Day, through Warner Music Australasia. This was followed in August of that year by a second EP, While We're Young. He was named the New Oz Artist of the Year at the 2013 CMC Music Awards.

Evans released a self-titled debut studio album in March 2014, which peaked at number 20 on the ARIA Albums Chart. At the 2014 CMC Music Awards he won the Oz Artist of the Year, Male Artist of the Year and Best Australian Video of the Year. His track, "Like a Tornado", was short-listed for the Vanda and Young Songwriting Competition of 2014.

He hosted the CMC Music Awards for three consecutive years, from 2015 to 2017. He is the 2016 Country Music Association Global Artist of the Year and has won five fan voted Country Music Channel Awards, including Male Artist of the Year.

2017–2020: Things That We Drink To 
Following his relocation to Nashville, Evans signed with Warner Music Nashville in May 2017, which led to the release of his debut US single, "Kiss Somebody".

Evans released a single, "I Do", on 8 December 2017. He explained via Instagram that it was written, "about his girlfriend, recorded it about my fiancée, releasing it about my wife" Kelsea Ballerini, whom he married on 2 December 2017 in Mexico.  In August, Evans released his third EP titled, Morgan Evans EP. Evan's second studio album, Things That We Drink To was released in October 2018.

On 8 November 2019, Evans released a new single titled "Diamonds" which he says is a love song written for Ballerini. At the global APRA Awards in March 2020, Evans won Outstanding International Achievement Award.

2021–present: The Country and the Coast and "Over for You" 
In September 2021, Evans announced the released of EP The Country and the Coast (Side A)

In September 2022, Evans performed a new song titled "Over for You" at the CMC Rocks QLD Festival. The song was written in response to Evans' divorce from then-wife Kelsea Ballerini and the subsequent heartbreak he experienced. Evans later shared on his Instagram that the song had been written only three weeks earlier and the show performance was only the second time he had played the song. A studio version of "Over for You" was released on 17 October 2022.

Personal life 

Evans married American country pop singer-songwriter, Kelsea Ballerini, on 2 December 2017 in Cabo San Lucas, Mexico. They had started dating in March 2016, and were engaged on Christmas Day of that year. On 29 August 2022, Ballerini announced that she and Evans were divorcing. On 3 November 2022, it was revealed that Ballerini and Evans had reached a settlement agreement, finalizing their divorce.

Discography

Albums

Extended plays

Singles

Notes

Other charted songs

Music videos

Awards

ARIA Music Awards
The ARIA Music Awards is an annual award ceremony event celebrating the Australian music industry. Evens has won a trophy from two nominations.

|-
| rowspan="2"| 2019
| Things That We Drink To
| Best Country Album
| 
|-
| "Day Drunk"
| Song of the Year
| 
|-

APRA Awards 
Since 1982 the APRA Awards are run by Australian Performing Right Association to recognise songwriting skills, sales and airplay performance by its members annually.

|-
| 2018
| Country Work of the Year
| "Kiss Somebody"
| 
|-
| rowspan="2"| 2019
| rowspan="2"| Country Work of the Year
| "I Do"
| 
|-
| "Day Drunk"
| 
|-
| 2020
| Most Performed Country Work of the Year
| "Young Again" (Evans, Chris DeStefano, Joshua Kear)
| 
|-
| 2021 || Most Performed Country Work of the Year || "Diamonds" ( Evans, Evan Bogart, DeStefano) || 
|-

Country Music Awards of Australia
The Country Music Awards of Australia (CMAA) (also known as the Golden Guitar Awards) is an annual awards night held in January during the Tamworth Country Music Festival, celebrating recording excellence in the Australian country music industry. They have been held annually since 1973.

! 
|-
| 2018
| Kiss Somebody
| Single of the Year
| 
|
|-
|rowspan="3"| 2019
|rowspan="2"| "Day Drunk"
| Single of the Year
| 
|rowspan="3"|  
|-
| Song of the Year
|  
|-
| "Kiss Somebody" (Director: Jeff Venable)
| Video of the Year 
|   
|-
| rowspan="4"| 2020
| rowspan="2"| Things We Drink To
| Contemporary Country Album of the Year
| 
| rowspan="4"| 
|-
| Album of the Year  || 
|-
| Morgan Evans for Things We Drink To
| Male Artist of the Year
| 
|-
| "Young Again" || Single of the Year || 
|-
|rowspan="1"|  2021 || "Diamonds" || Video of the Year ||  || 
|-
|  2022 || ||  ||  ||  
|-
|rowspan="2"| 2023 || "Sing Along Drink Along" || Single of the Year || || rowspan=" 2"| 
|-
| Morgan Evans || Male Artist of the Year || 
|-

CMA (America) Awards
The Country Music Association Awards (America) are the premier country music awards show which is held in Nashville every year. Winners and nominees are chosen for by members of the Country Music Association.

|-
| 2014|| Himself || Global Country Artist Award || 
|-

CMC Awards
The CMC Awards are awarded annually by Country Music Channel Australia.

|-
| 2013|| Himself || New Oz Artist of the Year || 
|-
| 2014|| Himself || Oz Artist of the Year || 
|-
| 2014|| Himself || Male Artist of the Year || 
|-
| 2014|| "Carry On" || Australian Video of the Year || 
|-
| 2015|| Himself || Male Artist of the Year || 
|-
| 2018|| Himself || Male Artist of the Year || 
|-
| 2018|| Himself || Australian Artist of the Year || 
|-

ASTRA Awards
The Australian Subscription Television and Radio Association awarded 'Excellence in subscription television in production, programming and talent' from 2003–15.

|-
| 2015|| Himself || Most Outstanding New Talent || 
|-

References

External links
 

1984 births
Living people
APRA Award winners
ARIA Award winners
Australian country singers
Australian country singer-songwriters
Australian country guitarists
Australian expatriates in the United States
Musicians from New South Wales
People from Newcastle, New South Wales
21st-century Australian singers
21st-century guitarists
21st-century Australian male singers
Australian male guitarists
Australian male singer-songwriters